The following is the list of episodes for Mga Kuwento ni Lola Basyang (The Folktales of Grandma Basyang), a Filipino live-action children's television anthology series retelling popular Severino Reyes' classic tales. It headlines Manilyn Reynes as Herbie, Lola Basyang's compassionately strong-willed and high-spirited granddaughter who has made it her personal advocacy to disseminate Lola Basyang's stories; and Paul Salas as Herbie's eight-year-old son Efren. Together, they drive around in a "rolling library" packed with Lola Basyang's books and goes to various places to spread Lola Basyang's classic tales and golden values.

The show was originally aired weekly on GMA Network from February 4, 2007 to August 12, 2007 with the total of twenty-six episodes. It was also aired in GMA Pinoy TV from 2007 to 2008.

The show won Best Children's Program in 2007 Catholic Mass Media Awards.

Series overview

List of episodes

Season 1

Season 2

References

External links
Official GMA Network website

Lists of children's television series episodes
Lists of anthology television series episodes
Lists of Philippine drama television series episodes